Holsen is a village in Sunnfjord Municipality in Vestland county, Norway. The village is located at the eastern end of the lake Holsavatnet, along County Road 13. Holsen is the site of Holsen Church and Holsen school.

References

Villages in Vestland
Sunnfjord